Barbara Slade is a writer, creator and producer of children’s programming. Based in London, England, she travels extensively, heading up shows for the international market.

Career 
Barbara (both a British and U.S. citizen) began her screenwriting career in London when her first show “Brown Bear’s Wedding” starring Helena Bonham Carter, Joss Ackland and Hugh Laurie aired on ITV, Christmas Day. It sold to most major territories, and was nominated for five Emmy awards including ‘Best Writer’. Barbara returned to America, where she continued her career, writing and developing series for Nickelodeon, Disney, ABC, Fox and many other networks worldwide. She has written features for Working Title and Disney and has received numerous awards including a ‘Humanitas’ for one of her episodes of ‘Rugrats’. Among many others, Barbara developed and served as Head Writer for “Angelina Ballerina” and “Rotten Ralph”.
 
Barbara has worked as a head writer/producer for the Disney Channel U.K. and was brought on board to develop and head up the writing team on NRK’s prime time award-winning comedy series “Side by Side” now in its 8th season and "Best For" now on season three on TV2.
 
Barbara was Creator/Executive Producer on several original TV series including “Dead Gorgeous” (CBBC/ABC/Nickelodeon) “Hi Opie” (TVO/Netflix) and is now in development on three original tv dramas “Heaven is a Perfect Tomato”, "Song for Britannia" and "A Drop of DNA".
 
Barbara's specialty is writing, developing and heading up high concept television shows for the international market. She works with production companies and channels around the world and also leads intensive screenwriting and development workshops. The most popular is “The Beauty of a One Pager”, an intensive 2-3 day T.V. development workshop available for channels, production companies and media organizations.

Television credits 
Hi Opie! - creator/executive producer
Dead Gorgeous - creator/associate producer
Alexander and Pete - creator/executive producer
Inbox - writer/producer
Angelina Ballerina - series development/head writer
My Teen Genie - series development/head writer
Comin' Atcha - series development/head writer
Eloise - series development/head writer
Freefonix - series development/head writer
Rotten Ralph - series development/head writer
The Legends of Treasure Island - series development/head writer
Side by Side - series development/lead on writing team
Magnus - series development
Alle Sammen Sammen - series development
Rugrats (multiple episodes)- writer
Legend of Prince Valiant (multiple episodes) - writer
Little Shop (multiple episodes) - writer
Tales from the Cryptkeeper (multiple episodes)- writer
Sonic the Hedgehog (multiple episodes) - writer
Bill and Ted's Excellent Adventures (1 episode) - writer

Filmography 
Winnie the Pooh: Stories from the Hundred-Acre Wood - writer
Winnie the Pooh: Seasons of Giving- writer
Angelina Ballerina: Angelina Sets Sail -writer
Brown Bear's Wedding- writer
White Bear's Secret- writer
The Snow Queen- writer

Awards 
1992 Nominated for 'Best Writer' Emmy Award "Brown Bear's Wedding"
1995 Humanitas Award 'Rugrats': "I remember Melville"
1996 'Silver Honor Award' "Rotten Ralph"
1997 'Best Animated Series for Children' Cartoons-on-the-Bay (Italy) "Rotten Ralph"
1997 'Silver Apple Award' "Rotten Ralph"
2000 Nominated for Bafta Award for 'Best Animated Series' "Rotten Ralph"
2001 Nominated for Bafta Award for 'Best Animated Series' "Rotten Ralph"
2002 Nominated for Bafta Award for Best Animated Series "Angelina Ballerina"
2002 Nominated for Annecy Animation Festival "Rose Fairy Princess Award"
2002 Silver World Medal for children's programs at New York Festival
2006 British Animation Awards Finalist for Children's Choice "Angelina Sets Sail"
2006 Oppenheim Platinum Award for best video "Angelina Sets Sail"
2010 Nominated for ' Best Children's Television Drama' at Australian Film Institute Awards "Dead Gorgeous"

References

Sources 
http://www.imdb.com/name/nm0805150/
http://www.imdb.com/name/nm0805150/resume
https://www.linkedin.com/in/barbara-slade-72bb9235

British screenwriters
British television writers
British women television writers
Living people
Writers from London
Place of birth missing (living people)
Year of birth missing (living people)